JaCorey Shepherd (born March 29, 1993) is a former American football cornerback and kick returner. He played college football at Kansas, and was drafted in the sixth round (191st overall) of the 2015 NFL Draft by the Philadelphia Eagles.

Shepherd was also a member of the San Francisco 49ers, Pittsburgh Steelers, and Birmingham Iron.

Professional career

Philadelphia Eagles
Shepherd was selected in the sixth round of the 2015 NFL Draft as the 191st overall pick by the Philadelphia Eagles. On August 10, 2015, Shepherd tore his ACL keeping him out for the rest of the 2015 season. On September 3, 2016, he was released by the Eagles. He was re-signed to the practice squad on September 21, 2016. He was released on September 27, 2016 and re-signed on October 3, and was released again on October 7.

San Francisco 49ers
On October 10, 2016, Shepherd signed a two-year contract with the San Francisco 49ers.

On May 2, 2017, Shepherd was waived by the 49ers.

Pittsburgh Steelers
On August 5, 2017, Shepherd signed with the Pittsburgh Steelers. He was waived on September 2, 2017.

Birmingham Iron
In 2018, Shepherd signed with the Birmingham Iron of the Alliance of American Football for the 2019 season. He was waived before the start of the 2019 regular season, but was re-signed on March 1, 2019. He was waived again on March 25, and re-signed again on March 28. The league ceased operations in April 2019.

References

External links
 Kansas Jayhawks Player bio
 Philadelphia Eagles Player bio

1993 births
Living people
People from Mesquite, Texas
Players of American football from Texas
Sportspeople from the Dallas–Fort Worth metroplex
American football cornerbacks
Kansas Jayhawks football players
Philadelphia Eagles players
San Francisco 49ers players
Pittsburgh Steelers players
Birmingham Iron players